State Mutual Insurance Company is a mutual insurance company located in Rome, Georgia, USA, specializing in the sale of Medicare supplement insurance.

History 
In 1937, six prominent figures from Rome made a plan to provide a source of employment and income for the people of the town during the Great Depression. 113 citizens of Rome were granted temporary licenses to act as insurance agents. Titled the "Million Dollar Campaign", their goal was to sell $1,000,000 worth of insurance policies in order to save a company and the jobs held there. In three weeks, the 113 new agents sold $1,431,000 of new life insurance policies. These new policies and those that were managed by the state insurance commissioner were combined to form the State Mutual Insurance Company.

Corporate structure 
State Mutual Insurance is a mutual insurance company, so it is owned by its policyholders, not stockholders. Company decisions are made on behalf of the policyholders. State Mutual Insurance conducts business in 41 states including the District of Columbia.

When State Mutual Insurance Company was formed, it was originally chartered under Florida law because, at the time, there were no legal provisions in Georgia to accommodate a company without stockholders. In 1982, the company was re-chartered in Georgia.

Company growth 
During the 1980s, State Mutual absorbed six other life insurance companies and maintained policyholders and agents in over 30 states. State Mutual also purchased a savings and loan association, which was refurbished and then sold.

In the 1990s, State Mutual Insurance Company shifted its market to seniors. Life insurance and Medicare supplement products were developed with competitive rates. By the early part of the 21st century, State Mutual had over 1,000,000 Medicare supplement policyholders.

In 2010, State Mutual developed a secure, Internet-based application system for obtaining a Medicare supplement plan. Customers can request completely anonymous and secure quotes online, submit applications, and receive proof of their policies immediately.

State Mutual Insurance Company maintains its office in historic downtown Rome, just a few blocks away from its original 1936 location. A plaque hangs in its Rome office, celebrating its founding and states, "What Rome builds, builds Rome," and lists the 113 names of those involved in the Million Dollar Campaign.

See also 
 Old State Mutual Building
 State Mutual Stadium

References

External links
Company website

Mutual insurance companies of the United States
Companies based in Floyd County, Georgia
American companies established in 1937
Financial services companies established in 1937
1937 establishments in Georgia (U.S. state)